Charles Washington (1738–1799) was the youngest brother of United States President George Washington.

Charles Washington may also refer to:
 Charles Washington (defensive back, born 1966) (born 1966), American football player
 Charles Washington (defensive back, born 1993) (born 1993), American football player
 Charles B. Washington (1923–1986), American civil rights activist

See also
 Chuck Washington (born 1964), American football player